Dana Linn Bailey is an American IFBB Pro fitness and figure competitor (physique category). She is the winner of Joe Weider's Olympia in 2013.

Career
Dana Linn was recruited to play soccer for West Chester University, as a starting defender and help lead her team to NCAAs and playoffs. When she graduated from college, she made the transition to lifting, along with her then-boyfriend Rob Bailey.

She entered her first figure competition in 2006 at the Lehigh Valley Championships and competed in figure until 2010. She taught Physical Education at Conrad Weiser Middle School in Robesonia Pennsylvania until 2007, when she retired to focus on her bodybuilding career.

In 2010, she decided to participate in the very first Physique show, which was the 2011 Junior USAs in Charleston, South Carolina. She won overall, received her IFBB pro card, and became the first women's physique professional in the NPC/IFBB. She is currently on hiatus from the Olympia competition, focusing on her and her husband's gym.

 2011 Jr. USAs – 1st place and Overall
 2012 Desert Muscle Classic – 4th place
 2012 NEw York Pro – 16th
 2013 Tampa Pro – 2nd place
 2013 Dallas Europa – 1st place 
 2013 Olympia – 1st place
 2014 Olympia - 2nd place
 2015 Arnold Classic - 2nd place
 2015 Public Warhouse gym - open 
 2015 Co-Owned Flag Nor Fail Apparel, formerly solely owned by Rob Bailey 
 2015 Competed in American Ninja Warrior
 2018 Arnold Classic (powerlifting) - 877 lbs total (397.5 kg) did not place
 2019 Opening of online personal training program, DLB Daily
 2019 Brute Showdown Women's edition - 2nd place

Following Dana's hiatus from competing, the Baileys focused on the development of the Warhouse Gym located in Reading, Pennsylvania. The Warhouse Gym is their commercial gym following the creation of their personal gym known as The Warehouse. The Warehouse gym was an exclusive gym meant only for competitors – this is the reason the Baileys purchased and created a public gym known as The Warhouse. The Warhouse gym was a state of the art training facility featuring top-of-the-line equipment brands such as Rogue, Nebula, Legend, Prime Steel, Hammer Strength, Cybex, Life Fitness, and several custom made pieces. The WHG was opened 365 days a year, and hosted events such as the Veterans Outreach Workout.

Dana Linn Bailey (DLB) has made countless appearances since competing in events such as the Fit Expo, and guest-poses at the Flex Lewis Classic. Alongside these guest appearances, DLB has taken up several other competitions like  the American Ninja Warrior, has gotten to Nationals and The Arnold Classic for Powerlifting, and participated in the Brute Showdown Women's edition alongside Brooke Ence, Maddy Forberg, and Mattie Rogers.

DLB has also gotten more involved in the brand known as Flag Nor Fail, alongside husband Rob Bailey. Flag Nor Fail apparel has evolved with its owners to cater to more than just the fitness community but to the outdoors community. They have expanded to a larger warehouse since its creation and now ship worldwide to cater to the large fan base. The Baileys have also created their own supplement brand, Run Everything Labs, that features products like Enter With Purpose (their preworkout blend) and Destroy The Enemy (their thermogenic supplement). The Baileys have also created merchandise for all three brands (i.e., Flag Nor Fail, Warhouse Gym, and Run Everything Labs).

DLB has also launched DLB Daily, which an online training program for those who cannot make it to the Warhouse gym. For a monthly payment, her plan provides daily workouts designed for her audience with specializations in different weightlifting sports, with a simple generalized meal plan to help her clients reach their fitness goals.

Her net worth as of 2019 is approximately $1 million – $5 million.

References

1983 births
Living people
Fitness and figure competitors
People from Reading, Pennsylvania
West Chester University alumni
West Chester Golden Rams athletes
American female bodybuilders
21st-century American women